Roger Rey (born 19 April 1931) is a French former professional rugby league footballer who played in the 1950s and 60s.

Background
Roger Rey was born in Vedène, France.

Playing career
Rey played for Lyon, with which he won the French Championship in 1951 and 1955, as well the Lord Derby Cup in 1952. He also represented France at the 1960 Rugby League World Cup.

References 

1931 births
Living people
France national rugby league team players
French rugby league players
Lyon Villeurbanne XIII players
Rugby league centres
Sporting Olympique Avignon players
Sportspeople from Vaucluse
Vedène XIII players